Theerppu is a 2022 Malayalam-language thriller film directed by Rathish Ambat and written by Murali Gopy. The film stars an ensemble cast including Prithviraj Sukumaran, Indrajith Sukumaran, Isha Talwar, Vijay Babu, Saiju Kurup, Hannah Reji Koshy, Suzanne Bernert, Alencier Ley Lopez, Srikant Murali and Siddique. The film is produced by Vijay Babu, Rathish Ambat and Murali Gopi. This film is the second directorial of Rathish Ambat after Kammara Sambhavam.Theerppu was released theatrically on 25 August 2022 and opened to negative reviews from critics.

Plot 

Theerppu revolves around four friends who share a traumatic past. Their fathers are embroiled in a property dispute. While the sons enjoy the fruits of their fathers' cunningness, life takes a different turn for the one who is cheated. It’s about Abdulla Marrakar who is avenging his father's death. He does this by trying to kill Ram Kumar Nair. In the end, Abdulla dies by getting hit in the head by a rock. They dump the body in the ocean. Then an arm comes out of the shore. The movie then ends.

Cast 
 Prithviraj Sukumaran as Abdulla Marakkar
 Indrajith Sukumaran as Kalyan Menon
 Saiju Kurup as Parameshwaran Potty
 Vijay Babu as	Ram Kumar Nair
 Isha Talwar as Mythili Ram Kumar
 Hannah Reji Koshy as Prabha Nair
 Suzanne Bernert as Anastasia Aubert
 Siddique as	Basheer Marakkar, Abdulla's father
 Sreelakshmi as Beewathu, Abdulla's mother 
 Srikant Murali as Nair, Ram Kumar's father
 Mammukoya as	Musaliyar
 Lukman Avaran as Chandrabhanu
 Shaju Sreedhar as Menon, Kalyan's father
 Alencier Ley Lopez as Chandrapilla
 Aswin Kumar as the Commissioner
 Poojappura Radhakrishnan as the Village Officer
 Shameem Rein as Pavan Putra Bhede
 Vinod Vaswani as Lakshman Kothadia
 Mamta Mohandas as Dr. Shwetha (voice over only)
 Manikandan Pattambi as a police officer (voice over only)

Release

Theatrical
The film released on theatres on 25 August 2022.

Home Media
The digital rights of the film is acquired by Disney+ Hotstar and started streaming from 30 September 2022.

Reception 
Anna M. M. Vetticad of Firstpost rated the film 1.5 out of 5 stars. She heavily criticised how politically cautious it was and stated, “Prithviraj and Indrajith Sukumaran’s naturally arresting personalities cannot compensate for Theerppu’s ridiculously facile politics.” Manoj Kumar R of The Indian Express gave the movie 2/5 rating and commented that "the film seemingly has no inkling of how absolute power works". Lakshmi Priya of The News Minute rated the film with 2.5/5 stars, stating "the film can be read as a commentary on revisionist history and political appropriation with a lot to offer ‘between’ the lines, but the lines themselves have little solid to offer". S.R.Praveen of The Hindu said "Theerppu comes perilously close to living up to that joke that some films are made quickly within the limited space of a room or a resort, and having no content worth speaking about". V Vinod Nair of The Times of India stated "the movie fails to make the impact we expect, with the first half is just about watchable and the second half lags too much", but rated the film with 3/5 stars. A reviewer of Onmanorama called it "a serious drama trivialised by confused mix of theatrics".

References

External links 
 

2022 films
2022 thriller films
Indian thriller films
2020s Malayalam-language films
Indian films about revenge
Films with screenplays by Murali Gopy
Films scored by Gopi Sundar
Films shot in Kerala
Films shot in Kozhikode